Hour of the Ox is the fourth studio album by Irish singer and musician Katie Kim. It was released on 9 September 2022 on her own label, I Actually Like Music. Hour of the Ox was partially recorded at the artist's home and in Guerrilla Studios, Dublin with John ‘Spud’ Murphy. Additional field recordings were made in New York and Faithlegg, Co. Waterford. Hour of the Ox was released self-released on vinyl and via digital download.

Track listing
All songs written by Katie Kim. All songs were arranged by Katie Kim & John ‘Spud’ Murphy, except 'Into Which the Worm Falls' arranged by John 'Spud' Murphy. 

Side one
"Mona" – 5.02
"Eraser" – 4.56
"Feeding on the Metals" – 4.25
"Helen (Carry the Load)" – 1.16

Side two
"Gentle Little Bird" – 7.00
"Into Which the Worm Falls" – 3.13
"Golden Circles" – 4.50
"I See Old Joy" – 2.02
"Really Far" – 4.16

Personnel
 Katie Kim – vocals, guitar, piano, drums, bass
 John 'Spud' Murphy – vocals, synthesizers, bass, supersonics
 Kate Ellis – cello
 Shane O Brien – violin
 Sarah Grimes – drums
 Eleanor Myler – drums
 Radie Peat – vocals, bayan
 John 'Spud' Murphy and Katie Kim – mixing
 Harvey Birrell – mastering

Reception
Hour of the Ox received a positive reception. Amanda Farrah of The Quietus wrote "Katie Kim’s Hour of the Ox is filled with wild vacillations in the densities of the songs, sometimes within the songs." Georgia Howlett of The Upcoming, who gave it four out of five stars and described it as "haunted yet decadent". Siobhán Kane of The Irish Times also gave it four out of five stars, describing it as "resonant, evocative, and atmospheric". Writing for Hot Press, Will Russell called the album "an exquisite album that demands exploration". Malvika Paddin of Earmilk called the album "a luscious collection of music built upon an expansive and orchestral bed of strings, synths and minimalistic drum beats." Stephen White of The Last Mixed Tape opined that "Much like Cage’s arctic sonic explorations, Kim’s journeys far from the crowd in Hour Of The Ox yields the same fascination, and are essential to the diverse tapestry of Irish music."

References

External links
BandCamp
Irish Times Album Review

2022 albums